Cordillacris is a genus of slant-faced grasshoppers in the family Acrididae. There are at least two described species in Cordillacris.

Species
These two species belong to the genus Cordillacris:
 Cordillacris crenulata (Bruner, 1889) (crenulated grasshopper)
 Cordillacris occipitalis (Thomas, 1873) (spot-winged grasshopper)

References

Further reading

 
 
 

Acrididae
Articles created by Qbugbot